José Manuel Duarte Cendán (11 August 1936 – 22 November 2022) was a Spanish psychiatrist and politician. A member of the Spanish Socialist Workers' Party, he served in the Senate from 1977 to 1986 and the European Parliament from 1986 to 1987 and again from 1990 to 1994.

Duarte died on 22 November 2022 at the age of 86.

References

1936 births
2022 deaths
Spanish Socialist Workers' Party politicians
Members of the Senate of Spain
Members of the European Parliament for Spain
Politicians from Madrid